Mafuang Weerapol (is a retired Thai Muay Thai fighter.

Muay Thai career
Mafuang started fighting in the Surin and Buriram provinces as child, he made his Lumpinee Stadium debut in 1973, winning by knockout. He had bad results in his following bouts and ended up going back to the provinces to compete. He made his return to Bangkok this time fighting out of the Lukmatulee camp.

Between 1978 and 1982 Mafung was one of the most dominant bantamweight on the Bangkok stadium circuit. He was feared for his punching power which led him to hold the belts from both the Rajadamnern and Lumpinee Satadiums. His dominance saw him defend his belts multiple times and take on handicap fights.

Mafuang faced Muay Thai legend Samart Payakaroon on June 9, 1981 at the Lumpinee Stadium. He lost the fight by decision but their furious encounter was awarded fight of the Year by Muay Thai authorities.
Samart later described Mafuang as the opponent he was the most afraid of in the ring.

On August 24, 1982 Mafuang lost his Lumpinee Stadium title against Bangkhlanoi Sor.Thanikul
They rematched on one of the most important card in Muay Thai history headlined by the Samart Payakaroon vs Dieselnoi Chor Thanasukarn matchup at Rajadamnern Stadium on December 24, 1982. He was defeated by decision.

Titles and accomplishments
Lumpinee Stadium
 1980 Lumpinee Stadium 118 lbs Champion (3 defenses)

Rajadamnern Stadium
 1980 Rajadamnern Stadium 118 lbs Champion (1 defense)

Awards
 1981 Sports Writers Association of Thailand Fight of the Year (vs Samart Payakaroon)

Muay Thai record

|-  style="background:#fbb;"
| 1987-09-17|| Loss ||align=left| Chalao Muangsurin || Lumpinee Stadium || Buriram province, Thailand || KO  || 1 ||

|-  style="background:#fbb;"
| 1986- || Loss ||align=left| Sukkasem Lukarthit  ||  || Bangkok, Thailand || Decision || 5 || 3:00 

|-  style="background:#cfc;"
| 1985- || Win||align=left| Petpayao Kiatadee || Samrong Stadium || Samut Prakan, Thailand || KO (Punches)|| 1 ||  

|-  style="background:#fbb;"
| 1984-07-31 || Loss ||align=left|  ||Lumpinee Stadium || Bangkok, Thailand || Decision || 5 || 3:00 

|-  style="background:#cfc;"
| 1983-12-02 || Win||align=left| Densiam Sor.Prateep ||  || Ubon Ratchathani province, Thailand || Decision || 5 || 3:00 

|-  style="background:#c5d2ea;"
| 1983-08-26|| No Contest ||align=left| Samransak Muangsurin || Lumpinee Stadium || Bangkok, Thailand || Ref.stop. (lack of comabtivity) || 5 ||

|-  style="background:#cfc;"
| 1983-07-12 || Win||align=left| Rung Sakprasong|| Lumpinee Stadium || Bangkok, Thailand || KO || 2|| 

|-  style="background:#fbb;"
| 1983-05-10|| Loss ||align=left| Sornsilp Sitnoenpayom || Lumpinee Stadium || Bangkok, Thailand || Decision || 5 || 3:00 

|-  style="background:#cfc;"
| 1983-03-25 || Win||align=left| Phadam Lukbangbo || Lumpinee Stadium || Bangkok, Thailand || KO || 2|| 

|-  style="background:#fbb;"
| 1983-03-05|| Loss ||align=left| Chamuekpet Hapalang ||  || Chiang Mai, Thailand || Decision || 5 || 3:00

|-  style="background:#fbb;"
| 1982-12-24|| Loss ||align=left| Bangkhlanoi Sor.Thanikul || OneSongchai + Thanikul, Rajadamnern Stadium || Bangkok, Thailand || Decision || 5 || 3:00 

|-  style="background:#cfc;"
| 1982-12-03 || Win||align=left| Rung Sakprasong || Lumpinee Stadium || Bangkok, Thailand || KO || 1|| 

|-  style="background:#fbb;"
| 1982-08-24|| Loss||align=left| Bangkhlanoi Sor.Thanikul || Lumpinee Stadium || Bangkok, Thailand || Decision || 5 || 3:00 
|-
! style=background:white colspan=9 |

|-  style="background:#cfc;"
| 1982-06-22|| Win ||align=left| Bangkhlanoi Sor.Thanikul || Lumpinee Stadium || Bangkok, Thailand || Decision || 5 || 3:00 

|-  style="background:#cfc;"
| 1982-03-12|| Win||align=left| Jakrawan Kiattisaktewan || Lumpinee Stadium || Bangkok, Thailand || KO || 1|| 
|-
! style=background:white colspan=9 |

|-  style="background:#fbb;"
| 1982-02-26|| Loss ||align=left| Samransak Muangsurin || Lumpinee Stadium || Bangkok, Thailand || Decision || 5 || 3:00

|-  style="background:#cfc;"
| 1982-01-15|| Win||align=left| Samingnoom Sithiboontham || Lumpinee Stadium || Bangkok, Thailand || KO (Punches) || 3|| 

|-  style="background:#cfc;"
| 1981-09-04|| Win ||align=left| Fonluang Luksadetmaephuangtong || Lumpinee Stadium || Bangkok, Thailand || KO || 1 || 
|-
! style=background:white colspan=9 |

|-  style="background:#cfc;"
| 1981-07-14|| Win ||align=left| Kongtoranee Payakaroon || Lumpinee Stadium || Bangkok, Thailand || Decision || 5 || 3:00

|-  style="background:#fbb;"
| 1981-06-09|| Loss ||align=left| Samart Payakaroon || Lumpinee Stadium || Bangkok, Thailand || Decision || 5 || 3:00

|-  style="background:#fbb;"
| 1981-04-08|| Loss ||align=left| Jomwo Sakniran || Rajadamnern Stadium || Bangkok, Thailand || KO || 1 || 
|-
! style=background:white colspan=9 |

|-  style="background:#cfc;"
| 1981-01-23|| Win ||align=left| Manun Sor.Jitpattana ||  || Bangkok, Thailand || Decision || 5 || 3:00

|-  style="background:#cfc;"
| 1980-12-02|| Win ||align=left| Kongtoranee Payakaroon || Lumpinee Stadium || Bangkok, Thailand || Decision || 5 || 3:00
|-
! style=background:white colspan=9 |

|-  style="background:#fbb;"
| 1980-07-29|| Loss ||align=left| Paruhat Longnoen Thanusuk Prasopchai || 2 vs 1 Lumpinee Stadium || Bangkok, Thailand || Decision || 5 || 3:00
|-
! style=background:white colspan=9 |

|-  style="background:#cfc;"
| 1980-06-05|| Win ||align=left| Jomwo Sakniran || Rajadamnern Stadium || Bangkok, Thailand || Decision || 5 || 3:00
|-
! style=background:white colspan=9 |

|-  style="background:#cfc;"
| 1980-03-05 || Win ||align=left| Wanlop Pichitsamut || Rajadamnern Stadium || Bangkok, Thailand || KO || 4 || 
|-
! style=background:white colspan=9 |

|-  style="background:#cfc;"
| 1980-01-22 || Win ||align=left| Paruhat Longnoen || Lumpinee Stadium || Bangkok, Thailand || Decision || 5 || 3:00
|-
! style=background:white colspan=9 |

|-  style="background:#cfc;"
| 1978-06-06 || Win ||align=left| Pleungsawan Sitbowon || Lumpinee Stadium || Bangkok, Thailand || Decision || 5 || 3:00

|-  style="background:#cfc;"
| || Win ||align=left| Denphimai Kiatwiboon || Lumpinee Stadium || Bangkok, Thailand || KO || 3|| 

|-
| colspan=9 | Legend:

References

1959 births
Living people
Mafuang Weerapol
Mafuang Weerapol